The Apple was a short-lived American automobile manufactured by the Apple Automobile Company in Dayton, Ohio, from 1915 to 1917. The Apple 8 model cost $1,150 and had 44 horsepower.

See also
 List of defunct United States automobile manufacturers
 Dayton Electric, an early Dayton area automobile manufacturer
 Speedwell Motor Car Company, an early Dayton area automobile manufacturer

References

External links
 Dossier on Apple Motors

Defunct motor vehicle manufacturers of the United States
Defunct companies based in Dayton, Ohio
Motor vehicle manufacturers based in Ohio
Vintage vehicles